Yeh Hai Chakkad Bakkad Bumbe Bo (also known as The Sensational Six) is a 2003 Indian children's film directed by  Sridhar Rangayan, and written by Vijay Tendulkar and Sushma Bakshi. The film is based on a short story by Shakuntala Paranjpye and was shot on location over 20 days in Mandangad, Bankot and Mumbai.

Plot
The peace of their small Konkan village is shattered when four adventurous children come upon the dangerous smuggler Don Douglas. Two of the boys are caught spying and taken away by his goons. With the help of their monkey Sikander and their dog Birbal, the rest of the team must rescue them.

Cast
Mona Ambegaonkar
Aardra Athalye 
Rahul Joshi	
Ravindra Mankani as Headmaster
Anvay Ponkshe
Tom Alter
Seema Ponkshe as Fisherwoman
Brij Bhushan Sahni as Fisherman
Bakul Thakker		
Vinay Katore

Awards
 2004 Bronze Remi Award for Best Film at WorldFest-Houston International Film Festival

References

Indian children's films
2003 films
Films based on short fiction
Films set in India
Films shot in Maharashtra
2000s Hindi-language films
Films with screenplays by Vijay Tendulkar
2000s children's films